The Sulejowski Reservoir is an artificial lake, a reservoir created by a dam, built in the years 1969-1974 in the Łódź Voivodeship. The aim of this reservoir was to supply fresh drinking water to the city of Łódź and Tomaszów Mazowiecki.

History 

The idea of constructing a reservoir on the Pilica river was put forth in the 1960s. The existing water supplies could not fulfill the demand of the growing populations and industries in Łódź and Tomaszów Mazowiecki. At times, water rationing had to be implemented.

Water for Łódź 
The construction began in 1969,  from the outlet of Pilica, into the Vistula river; near Smardzewice. At the time the area was the border between the Łódź and Kielce Voivodeships. A slogan Water for Łódź (Polish: Woda dla Łodzi) was featured on a poster near the dam construction site and in the area where the forest had to be cleared for the future body of water.

A section of the pipe between the water treatment plant in Kalinko and a pumping station with storage tank in Chojny has an increased diameter - .

Early operations 
The usage of the reservoir started in May 1973; at the time it was the largest body of water in Central Poland. Later that year, the first water delivery to Łódź was completed. In 1977 the pipeline was supplying  of water per day, the highest waterworks production in the history of Łódź. By comparison, that volume was 2 to 2.5 times larger than the current usage by the whole city. The construction of a second pipeline with equal capacity was considered, but the decreasing demand from population, declining light industry and availability of other sources have made it redundant.

Construction of wells 
Deep aquifers were discovered and mapped in the village of Bronisławów, near the reservoir's shore. They offered much higher quality water and by the 1990s plans were put in place to replace the reservoir's supply with deep wells. The same pipeline was used, but since 2004 it carries water extracted only from the 7 wells near Bronisławów and the reservoir is no longer used to supply water.

New pipeline 
The degrading quality of the old pipeline and reduced needs led to a construction of a new water delivery system. It was constructed in 2009-2010 and partially funded by European Union grants.

Geography 
It lies in the Łódź Voivodeship, at the border of Tomaszów Mazowiecki, Opoczno and Piotrków Powiats. The Pilica and Luciąża inflows are located at the southern end of the lake in Gmina Sulejów. Parts of the lake and the shoreline are within Gmina Wolbórz and Gmina Mniszków.

Parks and recreation 
In addition to the water supply and energy producing functions, Sulejowski Reservoir serves as a center for recreation. There are multiple hotels and vacation homes in the vicinity and watersports infrastructure by the shoreline. The main activities are sailing, windsurfing, kayaking and fishing. The usage of motorboats is forbidden and a quiet zone is enforced across the lake.

A concrete pier has been constructed on the lake near Smardzewice. It will be revitalized in a new project set to begin in 2020. The total funding is 7.2 mln PLN, 4.7 mln of which will be funded by the European Union.

The reservoir lies at the northernmost part of the Sulejów Landscape Park which is centered around the Pilica river and contains protected forests.

There are 2 protected areas defined by the reservoir:

 Direct - all of the reservoir's water, including the former water intake in Bronisławów
The reservoir has been found to contain less pollution compared with other freshwater environments

Wildlife 
The protected area around the reservoir provides habitat for multiple species of wildlife, including:

 Fish: Common roach, Common bream, Common carp, Northern pike, Zander
Birds: Tern, Black-headed gull, Common pochard, Mallard, Swan

Gallery

References

External links 

A promotional article in English
The official website of the lake in Polish

Reservoirs in Poland
Buildings and structures in Łódź Voivodeship
Lakes of Łódź Voivodeship